The Huawei Ascend P1 is an Android-based smartphone manufactured by Huawei.  It is shipped with the Android 4.0 OS. It has been released in Canada exclusively for Wind Mobile and is available with or without a subsidy.

The device features a 4.3-inch qHD capacitive touch screen, 1.5 GHz dual-core processor, 3.5 mm headphone jack, 8-megapixel rear-facing camera, 1.3-megapixel front-facing camera, as well as an accelerometer and a compass. The QHD capacitive touch screen is multitouch capable.

Advertising
Wind, Huawei and Lions Gate Entertainment promoted the Ascend P1 by hosting a contest where winners had the chance to watch the premiere of The Expendables 2 and win the advertised smartphone.

See also 
 Huawei Ascend series

References 

Android (operating system) devices
Mobile phones introduced in 2012
Discontinued smartphones
P1